Bank Spółdzielczy w Brodnicy is a traditional bank in Brodnica, Poland founded in 1862. 

It is the oldest bank in Poland functioning continuously, over one hundred and fifty years.

Today this cooperative bank provides services via many branches including:
Bobrowo
Brzozie
Bydgoszcz
Gorzno
Grudziadz
Kurzętnik
Nowe Miasto Lubawskie
Rypin
Świedziebnia
Zbiczno, etc.

References

External links 
Homepage

Banks of Poland
Banks established in 1862
19th-century establishments in Poland